Cerauromeros is a trilobite in the order Phacopida that existed in what is now Illinois, U.S.A. It was described by Pribyl and Vanek in 1985, and the type species is Cerauromeros hydei, which was originally described under the genus Ceraurus by Weller in 1907.

References

External links
 Cerauromeros at the Paleobiology Database

Extinct animals of the United States
Fossil taxa described in 1985
Cheiruridae
Phacopida genera
Trilobites of North America